Nikolče Petrušev is a Macedonian former professional basketball shooting guard.

References

External links
 
 

1969 births
Living people
Macedonian men's basketball players
Shooting guards